Lee Young-uk (Hangul:이영욱, Hanja: 李永旭; born August 13, 1980 in Daegu) is a South Korean relief pitcher who plays for the Samsung Lions of the KBO League.

Statistics

External links 
 Career statistics and player information from Korea Baseball Organization 

SSG Landers players
Samsung Lions players
KBO League pitchers
South Korean baseball players
1980 births
Living people
Sportspeople from Daegu